Chengalpattu District is one of the 38 districts of Tamil Nadu, in India. The district headquarters is located at Chengalpattu. Chengalpattu district came into existence on 29 November 2019 when it was carved out of Kanchipuram district after the announcement about the bifurcation of districts on 18 July 2019.

Demographics 
Tamil language is the primary language spoken in the district.

Politics 

|}

Administration 
Chengalpattu District has 3 Revenue Divisions

 Tambaram Revenue Division: Pallavaram taluk, Tambaram taluk and Vandalur taluk.
 Chengalpattu Revenue Division: Chengalpattu taluk, Thiruporur taluk and Tirukalukundram taluk.
 Madurantakam Revenue Division: Madurantakam taluk and Cheyyur taluk.

Pallavaram, Tambaram and parts of Vandalur taluks lie in the Chennai Metropolitan Area.

District Panchayat 
Chengalpattu district has 16 district panchayat wards details of which are in

Municipal Corporation 
Chengalpattu district has 1 Municipal Corporation

Tambaram Municipal Corporation (Municipal Corporation for southern suburbs in Greater Chennai).

Municipalities
Chengalpattu District has 4 Municipalities
 Chengalpattu
 Madurantakam
 Nandivaram-Guduvancheri
 Maraimalai Nagar

Cantonment Boards
Chengalpattu District has only 1 Cantonment Board
 St.Thomas Mount cum Pallavaram Cantonment Board

Town Panchayats
Chengalpattu District has 6 Town Panchayats details of which are in 
 Acharapakkam
 Edaikazhinadu
 Karunguzhi
 Mamallapuram
 Thiruporur
 Tirukalukundram

Panchayat Unions
Chengalpattu District has 8 Panchayat Unions

Kattangulathur
St. Thomas Mount
Thirupporur
Tirukalukundram
Lathur
Chithamur
Madurantakam
Acharapakkam

Village Panchayats
Chengalpattu District has 359 Rural Village Panchayats.

Mudichur, Vandalur, Urapakkam, Pozhichalur, Tirusulam, Cowl Bazaar, Medavakkam, Nanmangalam, Kovilambakkam, Agaramthen, Mappedu, Sithalapakkam, Kovilanchery, Ponmar, Mambakkam, Thalambur, Siruseri, Muttukadu, Singaperumal Koil, Paranur, Kodur, Koovathur, Nedumaram, Seekinankuppam, Veerabogam, Manamai, Padur, Kolatthur, Manampathy, Mullipakkam, Karumpakkam and Cheyyur.

Assembly constituencies
Chengalpattu District has 6 State Assembly Constituencies:
Chengalpattu 
Tambaram 
Pallavaram  
Maduranthakam
Cheyyur
Thiruporur
Two State Assembly constituencies are partially from Chennai:
Alandur - few villages like Moovarasampattu and Cowl Bazaar only
Sholinganallur - few villages like Kovilambakkam, Nanmangalam and Medavakkam only.

See also
 List of districts of Tamil Nadu

References

 
Districts of Tamil Nadu